Halfdan Bjølgerud (13 February 1884 – 18 April 1970) was a Norwegian high jumper. He represented Ørnulf IF in Kristiania.

At the 1906 Summer Olympics he finished sixth in the high jump final with a jump of 1.67 metres. He became Norwegian champion in 1903 and 1906.

References

1884 births
1970 deaths
Norwegian male high jumpers
Athletes (track and field) at the 1906 Intercalated Games
Olympic athletes of Norway